Johann Cyriacus Kieling (Bennungen, 5 May 1670-1727) was a German composer who was Kantor at Brücken, then (from October 3rd 1712) Kapellmeister at Stolberg (Harz).

Recordings
Matthäus-Passion Felix Heuser, Vincent Berger, Malwine Nicolaus, La Protezione della Musica, Jeroen Finke 2CD Arcantus, DDD, 2020

References

German male classical composers
German Baroque composers
1670 births
1727 deaths